Yo soy Bea is a Spanish television comedy-drama series which aired on Telecinco from 10 July 2006 to 16 August 2009.

The series is an adaptation of the popular Colombian telenovela Yo soy Betty, la fea ("I am Betty, the ugly"). It stars Ruth Núñez in the title role of Beatriz "Bea" Pérez Pinzón and Alejandro Tous as Álvaro Aguilar, Bea's love interest. Yo soy Bea translates to "I am Bea"; it is a pun, with "Bea" sounding like bella, meaning pretty, and like fea, meaning ugly. 
 
The Spanish adaptation screened weekdays during the daytime and pulled in, on average, over four million viewers (over +35% share of the audience). The series' record is a 42.1% share. It was Spain's top rated daytime program.

Plot
Set in Madrid, the series tells the story of Beatriz "Bea" Pérez Pinzón (Ruth Núñez). She is a highly intelligent and well-educated young woman, but has trouble finding a job because of her unattractive appearance, which consists of oversized glasses, braces, big eyebrows, and a lack of fashion sense. She manages to get a job as a secretary at the coveted fashion magazine, Bulevar 21. She falls madly in love with her boss, Álvaro Aguilar (Alejandro Tous), the young, handsome newly appointed director of the magazine. Despite her mousy looks and social awkwardness, Bea earns the respect and friendship of many of her co-workers, including Álvaro, because of her hard work, dedication, and kindness. However, she still has to endure insulting comments from "the posh trio," made up of Cayetana de la Vega (Mónica Estarreado), Álvaro's longtime girlfriend, Richard de Castro (David Arnaiz), a photographer, and Barbara Ortiz (Norma Ruiz), Álvaro's other secretary. Bea documents her journey through love and work in an online blog entitled "Blog de una fea" ("Blog of an ugly girl").

Besides Bea's love for Álvaro, the main plot of the series is the power struggle between Álvaro and Diego de la Vega (Miguel Hermoso Arnao), Cayetana's evil brother. In order to keep Diego from taking the magazine's capital, Álvaro and his best friend and colleague, Gonzalo de Soto (José Manuel Seda), decide to set up a fake firm and move all of the capital into it. Álvaro convinces a reluctant Bea to head the firm by making her believe he is romantically interested in her. Bea believes she finally has the man of her dreams. During the course of their "relationship," Álvaro constantly mistreats Bea, cheats on her with Cayetana, and makes fun of her with Gonzalo.

Eventually, Álvaro, to his own amazement, genuinely falls in love with Bea. However, Bea overhears a conversation between Álvaro and Gonzalo discussing the set-up and breaks up with Álvaro. Álvaro tries repeatedly to get Bea to believe that he truly loves her, but to no avail.

Through the rest of the series, Álvaro and Bea endure many obstacles on their way back to each other: the firm being discovered and both Álvaro and Bea being arrested for embezzlement, Álvaro going to prison for a short time, various schemes and manipulations by Diego, other love interests, the death of Álvaro's father, and the revelation that Diego and Álvaro are half-brothers (Álvaro's father had an affair with Diego's mother). In the end, Bea becomes beautiful, Álvaro gets the magazine out of Diego's control, and Bea and Álvaro finally reunite and marry. Immediately after the ceremony, the two leave for Miami.

To replace Bea, a new protagonist, Beatriz "Be" Berlanga Echegaray (Patricia Montenero), is introduced. She wants to become a journalist and starts working at Bulevar 21. The other new protagonist is Roberto Vazquez (Àlex Adrover), the editor, who is later replaced by Cesar Villa (Miguel de Miguel), an investigative journalist.

Background
This is an adaptation of the original Colombian Fernando Gaitan, whose writing involved, among other authors, Covadonga Thick, Ariana Martin, Marta Azcona, Mercedes Rodrigo, Ignasi Garcia, Roberto Goñi, Juanma Ruiz Cordova, Beatriz G. Cruz, Veronica Viñé, Santi Diaz, Jordi Arencón, Daniel del Casar, Jessica Pires, Estefania Salyers, Deysi Porras, Benjamin Zafra, Sara Alquézar, Daniel Corpas, Beatriz Duque, Daniel Castro and Remedios Crespo.

Awards and nominations
Won

TP de Oro
2006 - Best telenovela
2007 - Best telenovela
Nominations

TP de Oro
2006 - Best actress
2008 - Best telenovela

External links

2006 Spanish television series debuts
2009 Spanish television series endings
Yo soy Betty, la fea
Telecinco network series
Telecinco telenovelas
2000s Spanish comedy television series
2000s Spanish drama television series
2000s comedy-drama television series
Spanish comedy-drama television series
Spanish television series based on Colombian television series